Milan Babić (born 5 August 1955) is a former Serbian footballer known for having played for the three major Serbian clubs; Red Star, Partizan and Vojvodina.

Career
Born in Nakovo, in municipality of Kikinda, in SR Serbia, back at that time still within Yugoslavia, Babić started playing as defender with powerhouse Red Star Belgrade. He made his debut in the 1975–76 Yugoslav First League and left Red Star at winter-break of 1977–78 season to play the second half of season with FK Radnik Bijeljina in the 1977–78 Yugoslav Second League.

In summer 1978 he joined FK Napredak Kruševac at time playing in the Yugoslav First League. Babić will marked an entire period of Napredak as he will play in the club since the late 1970s till the mid 1980s. His performances with Napredak at top level were so solid that he was brought by the other Yugoslav powerhouse, FK Partizan, to play in the first half of the 1980–81 Yugoslav First League. At winter-break he returned to Napredak to help them avoid relegation, however the club failed. Despite that, Babić stay at Napredak three more years playing in the Yugoslav Second League, all the way till the winter-break of 1983–84 season, when he was signed by FK Vojvodina, thus making his return to the First League.

After a season and a half at Vojvodina, Babić accepted a move abroad, signing in summer 1985 with French Ligue 2 side AS Béziers Hérault. After a season with Béziers, his spell in France was followed by four more seasons at French second level, by playing with  FC Montceau Bourgogne.

References

1955 births
Living people
People from Nakovo
Serbian footballers
Yugoslav footballers
Association football defenders
Red Star Belgrade footballers
FK Radnik Bijeljina players
FK Napredak Kruševac players
FK Partizan players
FK Vojvodina players
Yugoslav First League players
AS Béziers Hérault (football) players
FC Montceau Bourgogne players
Ligue 2 players
Expatriate footballers in France